Vladislav Borisovich Baitcaev (born August 8, 1990, in Ossetia–Alania) is a Russian freestyle wrestler of Digor descent. European champion 2018, twice Ivan Yarygin winner, he was runner-up at the 2011 European Championships and third at the 2013 European Championships, both times in the 96 kg classification. Also, he is a bronze medalist of 2016 Russian Nationals Championships at 97 kg and runner-up at the 2017 Russian National Freestyle Wrestling Championships.

Baitcaev won his first European Championships in Kaspiysk in the 97 kg category.

Biography

Vladislav Baitcaev was born in the village of Digora, North Ossetia-Alania, Soviet Union. He started to train in freestyle wrestling at the age of nine, but after one month he decided to stop training. Three years later he returned to wrestling. His first coach was Alan Dzagkoev. In 2005, he moved to Vladikavkaz where he was coached by Cesar Tibilov. Baitcaev represents the CSKA wrestling club in Moscow.

Championships and achievements

Ivan Yarygin GP 2013 – 1st (96 kg)
Ivan Yarygin GP 2020 – 1st (97 kg)
Ivan Yarygin GP 2011 – 2nd (96 kg)
European Championships 2011 – 2nd (96 kg)
European Championships 2013 – 3rd (96 kg)
European Championships 2018 – 1st (97 kg)
Military World Championships 2018 – 1st (97 kg)
 World Championships 2022 – 5th (97 kg)

References

1990 births
Living people
Russian male sport wrestlers
Ossetian people
People from Vladikavkaz
Russian people of Ossetian descent
European Wrestling Championships medalists